John Durkin may refer to:
* John A. Durkin (1936–2012), U.S. senator
 John Durkin (footballer) (1930–1983), Scottish association football player